Love is a 2006 theatrical production by Cirque du Soleil which combines the re-produced and re-imagined music of the Beatles with an interpretive, circus-based artistic and athletic stage performance. The show plays at a specially built theatre at the Mirage in Las Vegas.

A joint venture between Cirque and the Beatles' Apple Corps Ltd, it is the first theatrical production that Apple Corps Ltd. has partnered in. Love is written and directed by Dominic Champagne. Music directors are George Martin, producer of nearly all of the Beatles' records, and his son, record producer Giles Martin.  A soundtrack album of the show was released in November 2006.

History

The project arose from discussions in 2000 between George Harrison and his friend Guy Laliberté, one of Cirque's founders. Three years of negotiations between surviving members of the Beatles, Paul McCartney and Ringo Starr, the Beatles widows Olivia Harrison (representing George Harrison) and Yoko Ono (representing John Lennon), the Beatles' holding company Apple Corps Ltd. and the MGM Mirage culminated in an agreement.

The first executive producer was Neil Aspinall, then-manager of Apple Corps Ltd. Dominic Champagne shares the show concept creator credit with Gilles Ste-Croix (a founder of Cirque), who is also credited as the director of creation. The creation director is Chantal Tremblay. Tickets went on sale April 19, 2006. Preview performances ran from June 2 to June 29. During these shows, including June 16 and June 17 which were attended by McCartney. In attendance at the gala opening on June 30 were McCartney, Starr, Ono, Cynthia Lennon, Julian Lennon, Olivia and Dhani Harrison, and George Martin. It was the biggest reunion of the Beatles' 'family' since the band's breakup. At the end of the show, McCartney, Starr, Olivia, Ono and Martin went on stage.

On June 26, 2007, everyone met for the first anniversary of the show at the Mirage, where the Love show is staged. McCartney, Starr, Olivia and Ono were interviewed by CNN's Larry King shortly before the show began. The group unveiled a plaque at the Mirage Hotel in Las Vegas in memory of John Lennon and George Harrison.

Starting in late October 2010, Cirque du Soleil offered backstage tours of the Love theatre. The experience allows visitors to see the backstage wings, training rooms, costume workshop, and break area, and go up to a catwalk into the sound and lighting booths. Not every experience will be the same, as the tour is conducted around a "regular day", so performers may or may not be training, rehearsing, or even working out.

Leading up to the show's 10th anniversary in July 2016, producers updated the production, which included changes to imagery, costumes, and acts, as well as the addition and removal of pieces of music.

Due to the COVID-19 pandemic, the show was shut down from March 2020 until August 2021.

Set and technical information

Created by French designer Jean Rabasse, the Love theater at The Mirage houses 6,351 speakers and 2,013 seats set around a central stage. Each seat is fitted with three speakers, including a pair in the headrest. The sound system was designed by Jonathan Deans. The stage includes 11 lifts, 4 traps, and 13 automated tracks and trolleys. Each lift is capable of lifting 20,000 pounds

The LOVE theatre features 32 digital projectors that are used in the show.  Everything is digital from source to screen, making very large high definition digital 100’ wide panoramic images. Video images on two walls above the audience on two sides of the auditorium emphasize elements of the show and provide transitions. High-definition projectors also create enormous images (designed by Francis Laporte) on four translucent screens that can be unfurled to divide the auditorium.

The Love theater, which replaced the Siegfried & Roy theater at The Mirage, is said to have cost more than $100 million. The theater is set up as a circular theatre in the round, with seats 360 degrees around the stage. There are four balconies in the theater, and the furthest seat from the absolute center of the stage is only 98 feet. The closest seat to the absolute center of the stage is 23 feet and 4 inches, which is only 2 feet and 9 inches from the edge of the stage.

Storyline
The loose story of the production traces the Beatles' biography in broad strokes from the Blitz, through the band's founding and climb into superstardom, their psychedelic and spiritual works and their break-up in 1970. The finale is a joyous celebration of the Beatles' "reunion" that the show itself represents.

Love traces this path without relying on literal or historical representations of individual people. Its landscape is inhabited by fictional characters plucked from the Beatles' lyrics. Sgt. Pepper, a central figure, encounters such characters as Lucy in the Sky, Eleanor Rigby, Lady Madonna and Mr. Kite. In an exception to this stylistic choice, the "Here Comes the Sun" scene features a character resembling Krishna. Similarly, several scenes include mop-topped, dark-haired figures in black suits who resemble the Beatles. The international cast totals 65 performers. Each song or medley is the name of a scene.

Characters

Love has a plethora of characters which are inspired by the music of the Beatles.
 Doctor Robert: The host of Love.
 Eleanor Rigby: An English woman.
 Father McKenzie: A preacher from older times.
 Fool: A strange man on Roller skates.
 Groupies: The unrelenting fans of the Beatles
 Her Majesty: As a symbol of pride for the nation, she is often seen in a large oval frame.
 Julia: Evokes John Lennon's mother, Julia Lennon.
 Mr. Kite and Helter Skelter:.
 Kids of Liverpool
 Krishna: Unites the cultures and sounds of the East and West.
 Lady Madonna: A character who represents motherhood.
 Lucy and the Firemen: A duo of lovers.
 Mr. Piggy: Represents the aristocratic traditional values.
 Nowhere Men: Represent the zeitgeist of Love. The Nowhere men are four characters: Pink Nowhere man, Dr Robert, the Fool, and Eggman. 
 Nurses: The caregiving stagehands of Love.
 Sailors
 Sgt. Pepper: A Ringmaster-like character.
 Sugar Plum Fairy: A charming disc jockey.
 Teddy Boys
 Eggman: A Breakdancer.

Acts
Love features elaborate choreography and various acrobatic and aerial performances.

 Come Together
 Get Back - Bungee
 Solo Bar
 Trapeze
 Here Comes the Sun - Rope contortion
 Aerial Russian swing (Kris Carrison)
 Sgt. Pepper - Korean rope
 Back in the U.S.S.R. - Trampoline
 Latex rope
 Help! - Skater
 Spanish web
 Free running

Costumes
Philippe Guilottel, Loves costume designer, wanted to infuse the same spirit of the Beatles into the costumes for Love. Many include juxtaposed elements, such as traditional and Victorian fashions being combined with colorful, imaginative designs.  Many of the costumes are highly sophisticated and voluminous, almost as if taken from a cartoon.  For example, Savile Row tailoring traditions were utilized for the Sgt. Pepper Parade, turning the outfits inside out.

Music

Unlike most other Cirque productions, which feature live music, Love uses prerecorded material from the Beatles' catalog. Many of the original Abbey Road Studios recording session tapes have been reorchestrated and inspired Love'''s dance, acrobatics, as well as visual and theatrical effects. Sir George Martin, the Beatles' original producer, and his son Giles Martin worked with the entire archive of Beatles recordings to create the musical component for Love. The result is an unprecedented approach to the music for a stage production. Love samples 120 songs to create 27 musical pieces. The songs are mixed so that the lyrics and instrumentation from one song blend into the next. One musical highlight of the show is a new version of "While My Guitar Gently Weeps", which matches the first studio demo of the song with a string arrangement written for Love by Sir George Martin. A commercial soundtrack of the show was released in November 2006.

Filmography
A documentary on the making of Love titled All Together Now was released on October 20, 2008.

The following scenes from Love are included in Cirque du Soleil: Worlds Away'':
 "Lucy in the Sky with Diamonds"
 "Blackbird"
 "Octopus' Garden"
 "Being for the Benefit of Mr. Kite"
 "While My Guitar Gently Weeps"
 "Get Back/Glass Onion"

References

External links

 
 It's big-top Beatles, by George
 Something in the Way You Remix, NPR Interview with Giles Martin

Cirque du Soleil resident shows
Musicals based on songs by the Beatles
Production shows in the Las Vegas Valley
2006 musicals
2006 establishments in Nevada
Las Vegas shows